Revolver Rani is a 2014 Indian Hindi-language crime comedy drama film written and directed by Sai Kabir. Presented by Wave Cinemas, the film stars Kangana Ranaut and Vir Das, with Piyush Mishra, Zakir Hussain and Pankaj Saraswat in supporting roles. It is a satirical love story set against the backdrop of politics. Revolver Rani was released on 25 April 2014.

Plot
Alka Singh (Kangana Ranaut) is the leader of a political party who loves Rohan Mehra (Vir Das), a rising star of Bollywood. The elections in Gwalior have just finished and Alka's reign has come to an end. Her opposition, the Tomar party, have come into power and want to use their new position to take out Alka, but first, they want to hurt her. The Tomars abduct Rohan from Mumbai and take him back to Gwalior with the aim to kill him. They are about to pull the trigger when Revolver Rani turns up, all guns blazing and saves his life.

Production
Sai Kabir, who has directed Revolver Rani, said in an Interview, "It was a great experience… we shot the film in Chambal. It's a black comedy and it's a political film". Producer Tigmanshu Dhulia says that Revolver Rani is a complete B grade entertainment movie and everybody will like it. It was reported that Kangana Ranaut and other crew members were stopped by rebels near Chambal valley to capture photos with Kangana. Kangana denied their request and succeeded to get herself and the crew out from the spot.

Cast

 Kangana Ranaut as Alka Singh / Rani behen(Aka Revolver Rani)
 Vir Das as Rohan Mehra
 Mohit Sharma as Satish Verma
 Nikunj Malik as Zahira(introducing)
 Piyush Mishra as Balli
 Zakir Hussain as Udaybhan Tomar
 Pankaj Saraswat as Govind Tomar
 Zeishan Quadri as Pilot
 Kumud Mishra as Tomar
 Preeti Sood as Gutki
 Salim Javed as Puneet
 Jami Jafry as Mithilesh Singh
 Zafar Khan as Bheem Singh
 Rahul Gandhi as Jay
 Abhijeet Shetty as Viru
 Pathy Aiyar as CEO of OZO
 Sanjay Singh as Home Minister
 Mishkka Singh as Payal Parihar

Themes
Revolver Rani is an experimental film that can best be described as an indigenous tongue-in-cheek Western featuring a rugged cowgirl as opposed to a cowboy straight out of some Western pulp novel.

Soundtrack

The soundtrack composed by Sanjeev Srivastava received positive reviews. The soundtrack consists of 9 tracks with Usha Uthup singing title number "Revolver Rani" which reflected the style of R. D. Burman. The lyrics have been penned by Shaheen Iqbal and Puneet Sharma. Moreover, the composer Sanjeev Srivastava and lyricist Puneet Sharma are new. The soundtrack of Revolver Rani is unconventional and largely experimental. Rediff gave 3/5 stars for the soundtrack.

Track listing

Critical reception
It has received an aggregate score of 5.6 (out of 10) on the review aggregating site TheReviewMonk, based on 30 critic reviews.
As per Shubha Shetty-Saha of Mid-Day The film Revolver Rani starts with much promise, with a kind of quirkiness and black humour that fits well, but it begins to fizzle out by the end of it. Watch it for Kangana Ranaut and the music. Film critic Subhash K. Jha rated it 3.5 stars and wrote that Revolver Rani is a fiercely original piece of cinema, crafted with compelling concentration and impassioned intuition. As per Jha, Kangana plays like a cross between Uma Thurman in Kill Bill and Seema Biswas in Bandit Queen. Giving it 3 stars out of 5, Anupama Chopra praised the film in a review for Hindustan Times saying that "what keeps Revolver Rani together are the performances and the sly humour. I particularly enjoyed the two testosterone-filled duffer politicians whose only aim is to kill Alka. If you like uplifting, cheerful cinema, then this isn't the movie for you. But if, like me, you can enjoy bad people doing bad things, then Revolver Rani will be fun." Harshada Rege from Daily News and Analysis praised Ranaut's performance, saying that "she plays the Venice-loving, gun-trotting politician in Chambal with much aplomb. From a vulnerable Rani in Queen to the mighty Alka Singh in Revolver Rani, the actress sure knows how to make and then, equally easily, break the mould." Shubhra Gupta from The Indian Express panned the film, saying that the character of Rani in the film was neither believable or relatable, making it "a tiresome Bollywoodesque trudge... It is clear that Kangana Ranaut is trying hard for the 'sur' (mass), but this is not her territory: she gets to that well-judged manic edge only a couple of times, and then slides back. Her hold on the character is slippery, as is her accent, and the shade of her tan."

Box office
This film had a brilliant run in the Indian Box Office with an occupancy of 95%.

References

External links 
 
 
 

2014 crime action films
Indian crime comedy-drama films
2014 masala films
2014 films
2010s Hindi-language films
Films shot in Madhya Pradesh
Indian gangster films
2010s crime comedy-drama films